Edward Benjamin "Ed" Koren (born 1935) is a writer and illustrator of children's books and political cartoons, most notably in The New Yorker.

Personal

Edward Benjamin Koren was born in New York City and attended  Horace Mann School and Columbia University, graduating in 1957. He did graduate work in etching and engraving with S. W. Hayter at Atelier 17 in Paris, France and received an M.F.A. degree from Pratt Institute.  He currently resides with his family in Vermont where he is a member of the Brookfield Volunteer Fire Department, formerly serving as captain.

Professional career

Koren began his cartooning career at Columbia while drawing for the college's humor magazine.  After college, he went on to teach art at Brown University.

In May 1962 The New Yorker accepted one of his cartoons.  It featured a sloppy-looking writer, cigarette dangling from his lips, sitting before a typewriter. Printed on his sweatshirt is one word: ‘’Shakespeare.’’

Since then The New Yorker has published thousands of his cartoons and illustrations, including dozens of full-color drawings published on the magazine's cover.  After several years of continued publishing, he quit his teaching job at Brown University and became full-time to cartooning.

He has also contributed to many other publications, including The New York Times, Newsweek, Time, GQ, Esquire, Sports Illustrated, Vogue, Fortune, Vanity Fair, The Nation and The Boston Globe. He has collaborated with numerous contemporary humorists and authors, notably George Plimpton and Delia Ephron.

Koren's cartoons, drawings and prints have been widely exhibited in shows across the United States as well as in France, England and Czechoslovakia.

Koren also contributed a Pond Village Pesto recipe for Miss Piggy's 1996 cookbook, In the Kitchen with Miss Piggy.

Columbia University's Wallach Gallery exhibited a retrospective of his work, "The Capricious Line" in 2010. Luise Ross Gallery (New York, NY) exhibited his work concurrently in the exhibition "Parallel Play – Drawings 1979 – 2010".

Honors

Edward Koren has received a Doctor of Humane Letters Degree from Union College, and received a John Simon Guggenheim Fellowship in Fine Arts in 1970. He received the Vermont Governor's Award for Excellence in the Arts in 2007. Koren was appointed Vermont's second Cartoonist Laureate in 2014, serving in the position until 2017.

Selected bibliography

Very Hairy Harry (2003)
All Together Now: A Y2K Program for Personal and Neighborhood Self-Reliance (1999)
The Hard Work of Simple Living:A Somewhat Blank Book for the Sustainable Hedonist with Chelsea Green (1998)
Quality Time : Parenting, Progeny and Pets (1997)
A Dog's Life with Peter Mayle (1996)
What about Me? : Cartoons from the New Yorker (1989)
Caution : Small Ensembles (1983)
Well, There's Your Problem (1980)
Are You Happy? And Other Questions Lovers Ask (1978)
Do You Want to Talk About It? (1976)
Behind the Wheel (1972)
Don't Talk to Strange Bears (1969)

References

Vermont Public Radio
Kingdom Books
Pippin Properties
New York Times

American cartoonists
Brown University faculty
Artists from Vermont
The New Yorker cartoonists
Pratt Institute alumni
1935 births
Living people
Columbia College (New York) alumni